Jonathan Meath (born September 16, 1955) is an American television producer and director. He was senior producer of the television game show Where in the World is Carmen Sandiego? He also was a producer of The Wubbulous World of Dr. Seuss and the 1990s' remake of Zoom. In addition, he is notable for having a dual career as a professional Santa Claus. He made numerous appearances in various media as Santa, including on Good Morning America, at Radio City Music Hall with The Rockettes, on the cover of Boston Magazine, and on a Delta Air Lines' pre-flight safety demonstration. He was described by National Public Radio and Time as a "top Santa".

Television career
Meath attended Phillips Academy and graduated in 1974 with the school's first co–educational class. He graduated from New York University in 1979. During the 1980s Meath worked at CBS, Business Times, The Creative Establishment, MTV Networks and Greenwood Productions in various capacities. During 1996–1998, he produced shows for the Jim Henson Company called The Wubbulous World of Dr. Seuss. He produced for PBS 295 half-hour episodes of Where in the World is Carmen Sandiego?, as well as 80 episodes of Zoom.

Career
Meath, whose beard and hair went white early in life, noticed that children sometimes called him "Santa". He is slightly overweight – he has described himself as an "organic Santa" – and his wife bought him a red suit. He attended schools to learn the craft of being a Santa. He appeared in parades. He is a professional vocalist. In 2012, he appeared as Santa at Radio City Music Hall for the Christmas Spectacular show in New York City. Meath uses his real beard but conditions it with a "shimmer-like shampoo known as Cowboy Magic, and uses hair gel for his mustache. His role as Santa was described in numerous publications. In 2009, he appeared in a thirty-second television commercial spot for the Boston Red Sox baseball team.

Personal life
Meath has one child and lives in Newburyport, Massachusetts. His mother was activist and historian Mary Stewart Hewitt. He is the great great grandson of businessman and sportsman John Malcolm Forbes and the great great great grandson of railroad industrialist John Murray Forbes. Through this, Meath is distantly related to John Kerry. Meath's daughter, Amelia Randall Meath, is a member of the bands Mountain Man and Sylvan Esso.

Awards

References

External links
 
 
 Jonathan Meath on NPR as Santa
 Santa JG website
 Santa JG on Facebook
  see 2:19

Living people
Television producers from Massachusetts
Santa Claus
Businesspeople from Cambridge, Massachusetts
Phillips Academy alumni
Tisch School of the Arts alumni
1955 births